Ashianeh-ye Olya (also Romanized as Āshīāneh-ye ‘Olyā, Ashiyaneh Olyá, Āshyāneh ‘Olyā, and Āshiāneh Auliya; also known as Āshīāneh-ye Bālā) is a village in Hamzehlu Rural District, in the Central District of Khomeyn County, Markazi Province, Iran. At the 2006 census, its population was 113, in 28 families.

References 

Populated places in Khomeyn County